Daphne Blake is a fictional character in the Scooby-Doo franchise. Daphne, depicted as coming from a wealthy family, is noted for her beauty, orange hair, lavender heels, fashion sense, and her knack for getting into danger, hence the nickname "Danger-Prone Daphne".

Overview

The Daphne character was inspired by the sophisticated teen character Thalia Menninger, as played by Tuesday Weld, from the late 1950s and early 1960s American sitcom The Many Loves of Dobie Gillis.

According to Scooby-Doo: Behind the Scenes, Daphne wanted to be both a supermodel and a detective even as a child (the latter of which disappointed her parents). Her aspirations had an effect on her personal life as she was late for dates whenever she went on mysteries with the gang; she and Fred deny the rumors that they are dating. Her father gave her and her friends the seed money to start off and, prior to buying the Mystery Machine, Daphne's parents gave her gas money to drive them to where there were mysteries to be solved.

Together with her other teenage companions, Fred Jones, Velma Dinkley, Shaggy Rogers, and Shaggy's Great Dane, Scooby-Doo, Daphne would engage in solving various mysteries. In the first series, Daphne was portrayed as the beautiful, enthusiastic, and eager to help, but occasionally clumsy and danger-prone member of the gang (hence her nickname, "Danger-prone Daphne") who follows her intuition. She sometimes serves as the damsel in distress and would occasionally get kidnapped, tied up, and then left imprisoned. But as the franchise went on, she became a stronger, more independent character who could take care of herself.

During the series' fourth incarnation, Scooby-Doo and Scrappy-Doo, some of the episodes focused on Daphne. In the episode, "Shiver and Shake, That Demon's a Snake", Daphne buys an idol which is cursed by a snake demon. On the sailboat, the snake demon attacks Daphne and demands an idol to return. In the episode, "The Scary Sky Skeleton", Daphne is reunited with her old friend, Wendy.

In the episode, "I Left My Neck in San Francisco", Daphne becomes sick and she's unable to help the gang to solve the mystery about The Lady Vampiress of the Bay. Due to the vampiress’s look, Daphne's unseen reflection in the mirror, the bat flying around Daphne's bed and herself returning to bed a little later, Scooby, Shaggy and Scrappy are convinced that Daphne is a vampiress. When the vampiress is revealed to be Lefty Callahan, Scooby, Shaggy and Scrappy realize they made a mistake in suspecting Daphne and she is feeling well again.

When the original Mystery Inc. group took a hiatus from the franchise in the 1980s, Daphne was initially absent too, with the series focusing on the comedy antics of Scooby, Shaggy, and Scrappy. However, when the "Whodunnit?" aspect returned to the series with The New Scooby and Scrappy-Doo Show (later retitled The New Scooby-Doo Mysteries), Daphne returned, now an accomplished investigator assisted by Shaggy and the two dogs, investigating supernatural occurrences. She continued to help Scooby battle evil forces of the supernatural in the 13 Ghosts of Scooby-Doo series.

In the film Scooby-Doo on Zombie Island, Daphne had a very successful investigative TV series called Coast to Coast with Daphne Blake on a fictional channel called "Americana", which the show had aired on for two seasons. The producer of the show was Fred Jones.

Throughout the various incarnations of the character, there has been speculation that Daphne and Fred had an attraction toward each other. This is emphasized in many of the direct-to-video films and the TV series Scooby-Doo! Mystery Incorporated. By the time of the second season, they are shown to be actively dating, showing more of their feelings toward each other. In the first live-action Scooby-Doo film, the two initially are just friends with but as the film progresses, they begin to develop a romantic interest in each other and briefly kiss after saving Spooky Island. In the sequel Scooby-Doo 2: Monsters Unleashed, they are in a relationship.

Performers
 Stefanianna Christopherson (1969–1970; Scooby-Doo, Where Are You! (season one))
 Heather North (1970–1997, 2003; Scooby-Doo, Where Are You! (season two), The New Scooby-Doo Movies, The Scooby-Doo Show, Scooby-Doo and Scrappy-Doo, The New Scooby and Scrappy-Doo Show, The 13 Ghosts of Scooby-Doo, Johnny Bravo, Scooby-Doo! and the Legend of the Vampire, Scooby-Doo! and the Monster of Mexico)
 Norma MacMillan (1971; Kenner Talking Show Projector record)
 Robyn Moore (1981; Pauls commercial)
 Kellie Martin (1988–1991; A Pup Named Scooby-Doo)
 Mary Kay Bergman (1998–2000; Scooby-Doo on Zombie Island, Scooby-Doo! and the Witch's Ghost, The Scooby-Doo Project, Scooby-Doo! Mystery of the Fun Park Phantom, Scooby-Doo and the Alien Invaders)
 Grey DeLisle (2000–present)
 Rachel Kimsey (2001; Scooby-Doo! in Stagefright - Live on Stage)
 Sarah Michelle Gellar (2002–2005, 2012, 2018; Scooby-Doo, Scooby-Doo 2: Monsters Unleashed (live-action), Robot Chicken (voice))
 Emily Tennant (2004; Scooby-Doo 2: Monsters Unleashed (young Daphne in a flashback sequence))
 Adrienne Wilkinson (2004; Scooby-Doo 2: Monsters Unleashed: The Video Game)
 Cree Summer (2005; Drawn Together)
 Selina MacDonald (2009; Scooby-Doo! and the Pirate Ghost - Live on Stage)
 Kate Melton (2009–2010; Scooby-Doo! The Mystery Begins, Scooby-Doo! Curse of the Lake Monster)
 Rachel Ramras (2011, 2013; Mad)
 Melissa Rapelje (2013; Scooby-Doo Live! Musical Mysteries)
 Julia Cave (2014; Scooby-Doo Live! The Mystery Of The Pyramid)
 Erin Cottrell (2015; Robot Chicken)
 Charlie Bull (2016; Scooby-Doo Live! Musical Mysteries)
 Sarah Jeffery (2018; Daphne & Velma)
 Cristina Vee (2020; Scooby-Doo! Playmobil Mini Mysteries)
 Amanda Seyfried (2020; Scoob!)
 Mckenna Grace (2020–2022; Scoob!, Scoob!: Holiday Haunt (both as a child))
 Constance Wu (Velma)

Appearance
Her usual appearance in the franchise consists of a purple mini-dress, pink pantyhose, purple shoes, and a green scarf. In Scooby-Doo on Zombie Island, Scooby-Doo! and the Witch's Ghost, and Scooby-Doo and the Cyber Chase, she wears a purple and green three-piece suit with matching shoes. In Scooby-Doo and the Alien Invaders, she wears a purple sleeveless shirt with pink shorts and purple trainers boots or shoes. She no longer wore her green scarf in What's New, Scooby Doo?, but still had purple mini-dress, pink pantyhose and purple shoes.

As a child, she wears a pink sweater, red skirt, and pink pantyhose with white go-go boots, which she hates getting dirty. In The 13 Ghosts of Scooby-Doo, she wears other purple and pink clothes, such as a purple jumpsuit and a purple dress with a white belt. In Scooby-Doo, she wears various outfits, but mostly a purple/pink dress with pink knee high boots.

Relatives
Relatives of Daphne, shown during the series' run include:
 George Robert Nedley Blake: Daphne's father 
 Elizabeth Maxwell-Blake: Daphne's mother
 Daisy Blake: Daphne's sister, a doctor. Voiced by Jennifer Hale.
 Dawn Blake: Daphne's sister, a model
 Dorothy Blake: Daphne's sister, a race car driver
 Delilah Blake: Daphne's sister, a Marine. Voiced by Jennifer Hale.
 Uncle Matt Blake: Daphne's paternal uncle, a cattle rancher
 John Maxwell: Daphne's maternal uncle
 Olivia Dervy: Daphne's aunt
 Jennifer Blake: Daphne's cousin
 Danica LaBlake: Daphne's cousin, a famous French model. Voiced by Vanessa Marshall.
 Shannon Blake: Daphne's Scottish cousin. Voiced by Grey DeLisle.
 "Sandy" Blake: Daphne's uncle, owner of a beach resort in Florida. Voiced by Adam West.
 Anna Blake: Daphne's cousin in the video games; Scooby-Doo, Scooby-Doo! First Frights and Scooby-Doo! and the Spooky Swamp
 Thornton Blake V: Daphne's uncle, owner of a golf course near Lake Erie

Frank Welker, Kath Soucie, and Jennifer Hale voice the Blakes in Scooby-Doo! Mystery Incorporated series, Vanessa Marshall voiced Danica in the What's New, Scooby-Doo? TV series, and Grey DeLisle who voiced Shannon in the film Scooby-Doo! and the Loch Ness Monster (direct-to-DVD video). Welker also voiced George on A Pup Named Scooby-Doo. Don Messick voiced two of Daphne's uncles: Matt Blake on The Scooby-Doo Show and John Maxwell on Scooby-Doo, Where Are You!.

In other media
Daphne was portrayed by Sarah Michelle Gellar in the film Scooby-Doo and its sequel, Scooby-Doo 2: Monsters Unleashed and voiced in the animated series Robot Chicken. Her husband Freddie Prinze Jr. played Fred in the same films and Robot Chicken.

In these films, Daphne and Fred began a relationship in the first film that followed on through the second. Unlike the previous incarnation of the character, Gellar's version of Daphne is trained in martial arts during Mystery Inc.'s 2-year-long departure in the first film, as she is tired of being a damsel in distress on every case that she is involved in with the gang. Coincidentally, this subversion of the damsel in distress to a strong female fighter almost mirrors Gellar's widely recognized role of the title character in the TV series Buffy the Vampire Slayer. Though in the first film, she is captured by the masked wrestler Zarkos, although she beats him in a fight at the end.

Daphne is portrayed by Kate Melton in the third film Scooby-Doo! The Mystery Begins (released as a TV film in 2009) and its sequel Scooby-Doo! Curse of the Lake Monster (which debuted in 2010) These two films are prequels to the first two live-action films and show how the gang met while in high school. Daphne is the president of the drama club at Coolsville High School and the lead in a school musical.

In Be Cool, Scooby-Doo!, Daphne develops a kooky personality and performs multiple hobbies such as doing hand puppets, beards, sleepovers, or vampires.

Amanda Seyfried voices the character for the animated film Scoob! while Mckenna Grace voices the younger version of Daphne.

On February 10, 2021, it was announced that an adult-oriented Scooby-Doo streaming television series, Velma, would be released to HBO Max, following the various members of Mystery Inc. involved in a "love quadrangle", with Daphne portrayed as an Asian foundling adopted by two mothers, with "complicated feelings" for Velma. In the fifth episode, it's revealed her biological parents are part of a Captain Caveman cult.

In the second issue of The Batman & Scooby-Doo Mysteries from 2022 the character temporarily took on the mantle of Batgirl.

References

Television characters introduced in 1969
Fictional amateur detectives
Fictional paranormal investigators
Fictional socialites
Scooby-Doo characters
Comedy film characters
Animated human characters
Female characters in animation
Female characters in film
American female characters in television
Teenage characters in film
Teenage characters in television
Female characters in animated films
Child characters in animated films
Female characters in animated series
Teenage characters in animated films